Augustus I may refer to:

 Augustus, Elector of Saxony (1526–1586)
 Augustus I, Duke of Brunswick-Lüneburg (1568–1636)
 Augustus, Grand Duke of Oldenburg (1783–1853)
 Sigismund II Augustus (1520–1572), King "Augustus I" of Poland and Grand Duke of Lithuania
  (c. 1766 – c. 1835), French engraver

See also 
 Frederick Augustus (disambiguation)
 Ernest August